Dylan Borlée (born 20 September 1992) is a Belgian sprinter who competes in the 400 metres. He is a member of the Borlée family.

He holds a personal best of 45.57 seconds for the event. He was the silver medallist at the European Athletics Indoor Championships in 2015. He has also represented Belgium at the World Championships in Athletics and IAAF World Relays as part of the national 4×400 metres relay team.

Biography
Born in Woluwe-Saint-Lambert, he is part of the Borlée family which is prominent in Belgian athletics and includes his older sister Olivia (b. 1986) and his older brothers, twins Kevin and Jonathan Borlée (b. 1988). All are coached by their father Jacques Borlée (b. 1957), who was himself a European medallist in the sport.

He made his international debut at the 2011 European Athletics Junior Championships, competing in the 4×400 metres relay team, which finished sixth. He began to establish himself as a senior athlete in the 2013 season. First, he secured a relay silver medal with Belgium at the 2013 European Athletics U23 Championships. After setting a 400 m personal best of 45.80 seconds for second place at the Belgian Championships in July, he was selected for Belgium relay team at the 2013 World Championships in Athletics, alongside his brothers and Will Oyowe. The team made the final and finished in fifth overall with a time of 3:01.02 minutes. The Jeux de la Francophonie the following month saw him make his first international appearance for Wallonia. He placed fifth in the individual 400 m and was a silver medallist in the relay alongside Robin Vanderbemden, Antoine Gillet and Oyowe.

Borlée missed most of the 2014 season, bar a relay outing at the 2014 IAAF World Relays, where he was ninth. He returned in strong form for the 2015 indoor season, winning his first national title at the Belgian Indoor Championships. A personal best of 46,73 seconds at a meeting in Metz earned him a place at the 2015 European Athletics Indoor Championships. In his first individual outing for Belgium, he ran a personal best of 46.72 seconds in the semi-final before improving to 46.25 seconds in the final – a mark which was enough to take the silver medal in Prague behind the clear home favourite Pavel Maslák. A day later he won the gold in the 4 × 400 metres relay, along with his brothers and Julien Watrin, in a new European indoor record of 3:02.87.

Borlée family

The progenitor of the Borlee family is Jacques, bronze medalist at the 1983 European Indoor Championships in Budapest on 200 m, while his first wife Edith Demaertelaere was a good sprinter with a personal best of 23.89. Six of his seven children are athletes (the first five born from the first marriage with Edith, the last two born from a second marriage).

The eldest daughter Olivia won the gold medal at the Olympics and the world bronze at the 2007 Osaka World Championships with the 4 × 100 m relay and the other daughter Alizia was also a decent sprinter. The four sons are all 400 m specialists, the twins Jonathan and Kevin, both Olympic finalists in London 2012, Dylan and the youngest Rayane. In addition, Jacques' older brother Jean-Pierre was also a sprinter.

Personal bests
Outdoor
200 metres – 21.05 (Brussels 2017)
300 metres – 32.51 (Liège 2017)
400 metres – 45.18 (Bern 2022)

Indoor
60 metres – 6.94 (Ghent 2013)
200 metres – 21.74 (Ghent 2013)
300 metres – 33.33 (Ghent 2015)
400 metres – 46.25 (Prague 2015)
All information from Diamond League.

International competitions

See also
 Borlée family
 Belgian men's 4 × 400 metres relay team

References

External links
 

1992 births
Living people
Belgian male sprinters
People from Woluwe-Saint-Lambert
World Athletics Championships athletes for Belgium
World Athletics Championships medalists
European Championships (multi-sport event) gold medalists
European Athletics Championships winners
Athletes (track and field) at the 2016 Summer Olympics
Olympic athletes of Belgium
World Athletics Indoor Championships medalists
European Athletics Indoor Championships winners
Athletes (track and field) at the 2020 Summer Olympics
Sportspeople from Brussels